Dr Law Kar-ying BBS MH (born September 22, 1946) is a Hong Kong Cantonese opera singer and actor.

Background

Born Law Hang-tong on September 22 (August 27 Lunar), 1946 in Shunde, Guangdong as the eldest son of actor Law Kar-kuen (羅家權) and his wife Lee Ngan-guen (李銀娟). His younger brothers are Law Yiu-tong (羅耀堂), Law Yau-tong (羅友堂), and Law Shiu-tong (羅紹堂). His younger sister is Law Sok-ching (羅素貞). In 1949, his family moved to Hong Kong.

He was originally a Cantonese opera singer in the 1970s. And a practitioner of the Ng Ying Kungfu (Chinese: 五形功夫) Five Animal Kung Fu arts. In 1990 he turned to acting in movies. He became popular after being cast in From Beijing with Love, which also starred Stephen Chow, as Da Vinci, an inventor whose list of (useless) gadgets include a solar-powered torch.

In 1990s, Law played Wong Yat-fei in his first movie debut in 1993 film Crime Story along with Jackie Chan. In 1994 he was cast in Jeff Lau's film duology A Chinese Odyssey, in which he played the verbose Longevity Monk (Xuanzang), singing a Cantonese cover of "Only You (And You Alone)" midway during the film.

Law has rarely acted in television, especially on TVB, the  television station of his wife, Liza Wang. He is most known for cooperating with ATV, which is TVB's rival.

In September 2022, Law apologized after mainland Chinese netizens criticized Law after he made a post, which he later deleted, stating "Hong Kong was a blessed land during her reign", in reference to Queen Elizabeth II.

Cantonese opera performances
In the 2018 HK Arts Festival, Law was cast as Xiang Yu along with Yau Sing Po in the classic opera Farewell My Concubine.

Filmography
Sources:

Crime Story (1993) – Wong Yat-fei
From Beijing with Love (1994) – Da Mansi
He's a Woman, She's a Man (1994) – Joseph
He and She (1994) – The Magistrate
Easy Money (1994) – Chiang Chia-Cheh
Whatever You Want (1994) – Keanu/Kwok-Wing/Actor on Television
A Chinese Odyssey Part One: Pandora's Box (1995) – Tang Sanzang
A Chinese Odyssey Part Two: Cinderella (1995) – Tang Sanzang
Heaven Can't Wait (1995) – Ng Kong
Dream Lover (1995) – Dr. Law – Kitty's uncle
Man Wanted (1995) – Bald Yin
Summer Snow (1995) – Bing Sun
Tricky Business (1995) – Lau Kar-Lin
The Chinese Feast (1995) – Au Siu-Fung
Because of Lies (1995) – Ho Siu B
Mack the Knife (1995) – Street preacher
Passion 1995 (1995) – Johnny, man in photograph
Ten Brothers (1995) – Wonderful Eyes
1941 Hong Kong on Fire (1995) – Hoi
God of Cookery (1996) – Competition Master of Ceremonies
Once Upon a Time in Shanghai (1996) (TV series)
Dr. Wai in "The Scripture with No Words" (1996) – Headmaster
Forbidden City Cop (1996) – Fat-Yan
Feel 100% (1996) – Robert
Feel 100%... Once More (1996) (uncredited) – Director
Bodyguards of the Last Governor (1996) – Last Governor of Hong Kong
Combo Cops (1996) – Tiger
Dragon from Shaolin (1996)
Viva Erotica (1996) – Chung
Those Were the days (1996) – Feng Siu-Tien
Twinkle Twinkle Lucky Star (Yun cai zhi li xing) (1996) – Cup Noodle
Another Chinese Cop (1996) – Li, Tai-Chu
A Recipe for the Heart (1997) (TV series)
Kitchen (1997) – Emma
We're No Bad Guys (1997) – Bond Chu/Jade Dragon
Lawyer Lawyer (1997) – Fong Tong-Ken
Love: Amoeba Style (1997)
S.D.U. '97 (1997) – Wong, Yan-Kwai
Made in Heaven (1997) – Dr. Law
Those Were the Days (1997) – Wong Fei-hung
Cause We Are So Young (1997) (uncredited)
Ah Fai, the Dumb (1997) – Uncle Ying/Iron Pen
A Tough Side of a Lady (1998) – Mulan's father
Chinese Midnight Express (1998) – Guard
Criss-Cross Over Four Seas (1999) (TV series) – Clergyman
Gorgeous (1999) – Chan's assistant
Funny Business (2000)
When I Fall in Love... with Both (2000) – Owner of bridal shop
2002 (2001) – Paper Chan
City of Desire (2001)
Far from Home (2002)
Windfall Profits (2002) – Uncle Sixth
Perfect Education 3 (2002)
The Monkey King (2002) (TV series) – Golden Star
Dragon Loaded 2003 (2003) – Mr. Lung
6 A.M. (2004) – Taxi Driver
Escape from Hong Kong Island (2004) – Raymond's boss
Osaka Wrestling Restaurant (2004) – Dragon
Enter the Phoenix (2004) – Father Eight
Magic Kitchen (2004) – Yau's Dad
House of Fury (2005) – Cab driver
Central Affairs 2 (2006) (TV series) – Kong So
The Shopaholics (2006) – West Ho
PK.COM.CN (2007)
Crazy Money & Funny Men (2007)
The Deserted Inn (2008)
Chongqing Girl (2009)
Metallic Attraction: Kungfu Cyborg (2009)
On His Majesty's Secret Service (2009)
14 Blades (2010)
Future X-Cops (2010)
Flirting Scholar 2 (2010)
Adventure of the King (2010)
Legend of the Swordsman (2010)
Painted Skin (2011) (TV series)
The Sorcerer and the White Snake (2011)
The 33D Invader (2011)
Single Terminator (2011)
The Assassins (2012)
Mr. and Mrs. Gambler (2012)
To Forgive (2012)
Tears in Heaven (2012)
Murcielago (2013)
The Twins' Code (2013)
A Stupid Journey (2014)
The Buddha's Shadow (2014)
Who Moved My Dream (2014)
Death Trip (2015)
The Ghost House (2015)
Super Models (2015)
From Vegas to Macau III (2016)
The Great Detective (2017)
Staycation (2018)
The Incredible Monk (2018)
Comedy Star (2018)
A Home with a View (2018)
White Bone Lady Fights the Wolf Demon (2018)
Bajie Subdues Demons (2018)
Amazing Spring (2019)
A Home with a View (2019)
The Great Detective (2019)
Bajie Subdues Demons 2 (2019)
The Duke of Royal Tramp (2019)
Dynasty Warriors (2021)

Music Video

Personal life
In 2004, Law was diagnosed with stage III liver cancer. In 2005, Law had surgery and recovered at home. In 2013, his liver was found to have a two-centimeter tumor and went for surgery again. He has led a healthy lifestyle since then. In 2019, doctors found cancerous cells after Law went for a prostate biopsy earlier in the year. He went to the hospital in last June for an operation to remove the prostate and has recovered since 

On May 2, 2009, Law married longtime partner Liza Wang in Las Vegas. They announced their union on TVB through Stephen Chow. On July 1, 2018, Law was awarded Bronze Bauhinia Star (BBS) by the Chief Executive of Hong Kong Special Administration Region, in recognition of his contribution to the Cantonese opera in Hong Kong.

References

External links

HK Cinemagic entry

 

Hong Kong male film actors
People from Foshan
1946 births
Living people
Hong Kong male Cantonese opera actors
Hong Kong television presenters
Hong Kong male television actors
Male actors from Guangdong
20th-century Hong Kong male actors
21st-century Hong Kong male actors
20th-century Hong Kong male singers
21st-century Hong Kong male singers
Chinese male film actors
Chinese male television actors
20th-century Chinese male actors
21st-century Chinese male actors
Recipients of the Bronze Bauhinia Star
Hong Kong male comedians